Rajendra Kumari Bajpai (8 February 1925 – 17 July 1999) was an Indian National Congress politician, a former Union Minister of India and former Lieutenant Governor of Pondicherry. She was elected three times to the Lok Sabha from Sitapur constituency in 1980, 1984 and 1989 and was a close confidant of former Prime Minister Indira Gandhi.

Early life and family
She was born on 8 February 1925 in Laluchak, Bhagalpur district, Bihar to Pt. S.K. Mishra, she was the granddaughter of Ravi Shankar Shukla and niece of Shyama Charan Shukla. After her schooling she received  M.A. and Ph.D. degrees from Allahabad University.

She married D.N. Bajpai, a teacher by profession in 1947, who also took part in the Quit India Movement of 1942. The couple had a son Ashok Bajpai and a daughter Mrs. Manisha Dwivedi.

Career
She was member of the Legislative Assembly of Uttar Pradesh from 1962 to 77; remained the head of Uttar Pradesh Congress Committee (UPCC) and a close confidant of former Prime Minister Indira Gandhi. Eventually she held various ministries in the Cabinet of Uttar Pradesh (1970–77). Thereafter, she was elected to the Lok Sabha three consecutive times from Sitapur in 1980, 1984 and 1989. She became Union Minister of State with independent charge of Ministry of Social Welfare (1984–86), Minister of State with independent charge of Labour (1986–87) and Minister of State with independent charge of Welfare (1987–89) with Rajiv Gandhi as Prime Minister. She was appointed lieutenant governor of Pondicherry from 2 May 1995 to 22 April 1998.

She died on 17 July 1999 at Allahabad after a prolonged kidney-related illness. She was survived by her husband and children. At the time of her death, her son Ashok Bajpai was president of the District Congress committee, while Dr Ranjana Bajpai, her daughter-in-law was president of Uttar Pradesh Mahila Congress.

References

Indian National Congress politicians from Uttar Pradesh
Women state governors of India
1925 births
1999 deaths
People from Sitapur district
Politicians from Allahabad
Uttar Pradesh MLAs 1962–1967
Uttar Pradesh MLAs 1967–1969
Uttar Pradesh MLAs 1969–1974
Uttar Pradesh MLAs 1974–1977
India MPs 1980–1984
India MPs 1984–1989
India MPs 1989–1991
Union ministers of state of India
Lok Sabha members from Uttar Pradesh
Lieutenant Governors of Puducherry
University of Allahabad alumni
State cabinet ministers of Uttar Pradesh
People from Bhagalpur district
Women in Uttar Pradesh politics
Women in Puducherry politics
20th-century Indian women politicians
20th-century Indian politicians
Women state cabinet ministers of India